Tough is a compilation album by British rock artists Wishbone Ash, released in May 2008 by the Talking Elephant label. It features rock numbers by the band and complements the album Tender, featuring a compilation of mellow tunes, that was released at the same time.

Track listing
 "Mountainside"
 "Wait Out The Storm"
 "Almighty Blues"
 "Changing Tracks"
 "Ancient Remedy"
 "Eyes Wide Open"
 "The Power"
 "Healing Ground"
 "In Crisis"

References

2008 compilation albums
Wishbone Ash compilation albums